{{DISPLAYTITLE:C7H11NO2}}
The molecular formula C7H11NO2 (molar mass: 141.17 g/mol, exact mass: 141.0790 u) may refer to:

 Arecaidine
 Ethosuximide
 Guvacoline
 Hypoglycin A

Molecular formulas